Érezée is a municipality of Wallonia located in the province of Luxembourg, Belgium. 

The municipality consists of the following districts: Amonines, Érezée, Mormont, and Soy. Other localities are Clerheid and Fisenne.

Attractions
Tramway Touristique de l'Aisne

See also
 List of protected heritage sites in Érezée

References

External links
 

 
Municipalities of Luxembourg (Belgium)